Katrina Broussard (born October 8, 1969) is an R&B singer and songwriter. Trina Broussard began her career in 1997 when she covered Minnie Riperton's song "Inside My Love". A year later, Broussard signed a recording contract with Jermaine Dupri's label So So Def, leaving after her first album was stalled.

In 2002, Broussard released her first album Inside My Love on Motown/Universal Records, with the singles "Sailing" and "Love You So Much". In 2004, Broussard released her single "Dreaming of One" as the lead single from her second album, Same Girl. The album's release was later followed by the release of two additional singles "Losing My Mind" and "Joy".

In 2009, Broussard returned to the music industry and embark on a short promo tour. She released two more singles "Adieu" (2016) and "Where I'm Supposed to Be" (2018).

Early life
Trina Broussard was born and raised in Houston, TX, influenced by her mother, who was a jazz singer, and her father, who played guitar in jazz big bands and accompanied pop vocalists Anita Baker, Stevie Wonder, and Donny Hathaway. She began her music career upon moving to Atlanta, GA, in 1990, singing background vocals for Bobby Brown, Pebbles, Babyface, Mariah Carey, Toni Braxton, and BeBe & CeCe Winans.

Musical career
Her first popular single was the Minnie Riperton song "Inside My Love," featured on the 1997 platinum-selling film soundtrack Love Jones. In 1998, Broussard co-wrote Aretha Franklin's hit record "Here We Go Again". Broussard was signed for a time to Jermaine Dupri's So So Def Label, writing for and working with such artists as Aretha Franklin. Her own project was stalled, and Trina then moved to Motown/Universal. In 2002, Trina Broussard released her first studio album entitled, Inside My Love, with the song Sailing as the first single. With the album receiving moderate success, Broussard continued with the album's promotion with the single Love You So Much.

In 2004, Broussard released the first single Dreamin of One from her second album, Same Girl. Same Girl was released in June 2004 along with the album's second single Losing My Mind.

In April 2008 in the UK Broussard's album 'Inside My Love' (which she had originally recorded in the late Nineties for Jermaine Dupri's So So Def label) finally got its first-ever official release, through seasoned London soul music independent label Expansion Records.

Announced by Broussard's management and Myspace, Broussard began recording her third studio album, Life of a Libra, with a planned release in 2010, though the album never materialized. During her 2009 promo tour, Broussard covered The Jackson 5's song "Never Can Say Goodbye", in tribute to Michael Jackson. Broussard later went on to become a backup vocalist for Rahsaan Patterson.

In February 2016, Broussard released a single entitled "Adieu".

Discography

Albums
1999: Inside My Love
2004: Same Girl

Singles
1997: "Inside My Love"
2002: "Sailing"
2002: "Love You So Much"
2004: "Dreaming of One"
2004: "Losing My Mind"
2005: "Joy"
2009: "No Pressure"
2009: "Off My Mind"
2016: "Adieu"

References

External links
[ Trina Broussard at AllMusic]
Trina Broussard at Soul Tracks

1969 births
Living people
People from Houston
American women singers
American contemporary R&B singers
21st-century American women